Salvador García (born 18 November 1953) is a Mexican boxer. He competed in the men's light flyweight event at the 1972 Summer Olympics.

References

1953 births
Living people
Mexican male boxers
Olympic boxers of Mexico
Boxers at the 1972 Summer Olympics
Boxers at the 1971 Pan American Games
Pan American Games medalists in boxing
Pan American Games bronze medalists for Mexico
Place of birth missing (living people)
Light-flyweight boxers
Medalists at the 1971 Pan American Games
20th-century Mexican people
21st-century Mexican people